Carlos "Iaco" Iaconelli (born June 26, 1987) is a Brazilian racing car driver.

Career

He spent much of his early career in karting before moving into single-seaters in 2004, where he competed in both Brazilian Formula Renault and the South American Formula Three championship. In 2005 he contested six races in the Spanish Formula Three Championship, finishing the season 20th overall. Carlos also contested a handful of races in Italian Formula Renault and the Eurocup Formula Renault series as well as making his debut in the Formula Renault 3.5 Series for the Austrian team Interwetten.com.

For 2006 Iaconelli raced in the Formula Renault 3.5 Series for three different teams - Eurointernational, Comtec Racing and GD Racing, taking part in twelve races but scoring no championship points. He also contested five races in the Spanish Formula Three Championship.

For the 2007 season he originally joined Interwetten.com for FR3.5, only to be replaced by Russian Daniil Move a month before the first race of the season. He did, however, sign for Pons Racing a few days later.

In 2008 he raced in the International Formula Master series. He also made his GP2 Series début mid-season, driving for the BCN Competicion team. He moved to the Durango team for the 2008–09 GP2 Asia Series season, but was replaced by Michael Dalle Stelle following the first round of the championship.

2009 saw Iaconelli move to the FIA Formula Two Championship, driving car number seventeen. Despite missing the final round at Circuit de Catalunya due to flu, Iaconelli wrapped up eleventh place in the standings, with his best result of second also coming in Spain, in Valencia.

Racing record

Career summary

Complete Formula Renault 3.5 Series results
(key)

† Driver did not finish the race, but was classified as he completed more than 90% of the race distance.

Complete GP2 Series results
(key) (Races in bold indicate pole position) (Races in italics indicate fastest lap)

Complete FIA Formula Two Championship results
(key) (Races in bold indicate pole position) (Races in italics indicate fastest lap)

References

External links
Official website
Career details at driverdb.com
 

1987 births
Living people
Brazilian NASCAR drivers
Brazilian Formula Renault 2.0 drivers
Formula 3 Sudamericana drivers
Euroformula Open Championship drivers
Italian Formula Renault 2.0 drivers
Formula Renault Eurocup drivers
International Formula Master drivers
GP2 Series drivers
Brazilian GP2 Series drivers
GP2 Asia Series drivers
FIA Formula Two Championship drivers
Auto GP drivers
World Series Formula V8 3.5 drivers
Blancpain Endurance Series drivers
Pons Racing drivers
EuroInternational drivers
Comtec Racing drivers
JD Motorsport drivers
Durango drivers